Mary Craig may refer to:
 Mary Craig (gothic novelist) (1923–1991), pseudonym of Mary Francis Shura, American children's, romance and mystery writer
 Mary Craig (writer) (1928–2019), British journalist and writer
 Mary Ann Craig (born 1981), British broadcaster and anthropologist
 Mary Craig Sinclair (1882–1961), née Kimbrough (1883–1961), second wife of Upton Sinclair
 Mary Lynde Craig, American writer, teacher, and attorney
 Mary McLaughlin Craig, American architect
 Mary A. Craig, translator of I Malavoglia by Giovanni Verga 
 Mary Alice Craig, mother of Marilyn Quayle
 Mary Ann Craig, wife of Joseph Stevenson (1806–1895)
 Mary Jane Craig, mother of George Cary Eggleston (1839–1911)
 Mary "Polly" Craig, wife of Toliver Craig Sr.
 Mary Craig, Miss Arkansas 1966
 Mary Craig, mother of Henry Irwin